"I Wish I Was a Punk Rocker (With Flowers in My Hair)" is the debut single of Scottish singer-songwriter Sandi Thom, released in October 2005. The song was written by Thom and Tom Gilbert. Following a re-release in 2006, the song topped the singles charts of Australia, Ireland, and the United Kingdom.

Inspiration
Thom has said on her website that she wrote the song after being robbed of her mobile phone and other belongings one evening, leaving her completely lost and without any way of contacting her family, friends, or the bank. She says, "I wondered if that had happened to me back in the days of the hippies what would I have done and would I have freaked out so much?" [sic]

Release
Although only physically released in the United Kingdom on 22 May 2006, download sales the week before are counted for the purpose of charts, and it achieved number fifteen on this basis in the general charts (and number seven in the download-only chart). The physical release had three formats: two CD versions (one featuring the radio mix and "A Light as Bright as Ours", another featuring the radio mix, the album mix, a further remix, "May You Never" and the music video), and also as a 7-inch vinyl record backed with Stranglers cover "No More Heroes".

Critical reception
The song was nominated for Record of the Year but lost to "Patience" by Take That.

Criticism
Thom has been the subject of criticism by many artists within the recording world, most notably from Lily Allen, the Fratellis, and the Automatic. James Frost and Robin Hawkins from the Automatic stated that "If she was a punk rocker with flowers in her hair she'd get the shit kicked out of her by other punk rockers, for having flowers in her hair. [...] I haven't found anyone who's told me they like that song and bought it." Charlie Brooker also heavily criticised the intense public relations efforts to make the single popular.

Chart performance
The song was released on 3 October 2005 by Viking Legacy Records, reaching number 55 in the UK Singles Chart. It was re-released in May 2006 on Sony BMG's RCA Records label, selling 39,797 copies in the week ending 3 June 2006, enough to reach number one on the UK Singles Chart, replacing Gnarls Barkley's "Crazy" following a nine-week run. It spent one week at the top spot and went on to be the UK's fifth-best-selling single of the year. The single also spent 10 weeks at number one in Australia, where it finished the year as the country's highest-selling single. It received a double platinum certification from the Australian Recording Industry Association.

Music video
The music video was shot in Bethnal Green in London and is all one shot.

Track listings

UK CD1 (2005)
 "I Wish I Was a Punk Rocker (With Flowers in My Hair)" – 2:30
 "Little Remedy"  – 3:01

UK CD2 (2005)
 "I Wish I Was a Punk Rocker (With Flowers in My Hair)" – 2:30
 "Something in the Air" – 4:15
 "No More Heroes" – 2:46
 "I Wish I Was a Punk Rocker (With Flowers in My Hair)" (video)

UK 7-inch single (2006)
A. "I Wish I Was a Punk Rocker (With Flowers in My Hair)" (radio mix) – 2:31
B. "No More Heroes" – 2:46

UK CD1 (2006)
 "I Wish I Was a Punk Rocker (With Flowers in My Hair)" (radio mix) – 2:31
 "A Light as Bright as Ours" – 3:55

UK CD2 and Australian CD single (2006)
 "I Wish I Was a Punk Rocker (With Flowers in My Hair)" (radio mix) – 2:33
 "I Wish I Was a Punk Rocker (With Flowers in My Hair)" (album version) – 2:31
 "I Wish I Was a Punk Rocker (With Flowers in My Hair)" (Mutiny's Rockers & Lovers mix) – 3:02
 "May You Never" – 3:45
 "I Wish I Was a Punk Rocker (With Flowers in My Hair)" (video) – 2:39

European CD single (2006)
 "I Wish I Was a Punk Rocker (With Flowers in My Hair)" (album version) – 2:31
 "A Light as Bright as Ours" – 3:55
 "I Wish I Was a Punk Rocker (With Flowers in My Hair)" (Mutiny's Rockers & Lovers mix) – 3:04

Charts

Weekly charts

Year-end charts

Decade-end charts

Certifications

References

External links
 

Songs about punk
2005 debut singles
2005 songs
2006 singles
Irish Singles Chart number-one singles
Number-one singles in Australia
Number-one singles in Scotland
RCA Records singles
Sandi Thom songs
Sony BMG singles
UK Singles Chart number-one singles